Disease reservoir may refer to:
Natural reservoir, the long-term host of the pathogen of an infectious disease
Fomite, any inanimate object or substance capable of carrying infectious organisms